Anders Johan Thor (1935–2012) was a Swedish scientist and teacher most notable for his
leadership in international standardization of quantities and units. He is one of the creators of binary prefixes and the IUPAC Green Book.

Thor obtained a Master of Science degree in electrical engineering in 1959 and the licentiate in mechanics and mathematics in 1964, both at the Royal Institute of Technology (KTH) in Stockholm. From 1962-65 Thor was lecturer in mechanics at KTH and became a professor in 1965.

From 1994 to 2001, Thor was an associate member of the IUPAC Commission on Physicochemical Symbols, Nomenclature and Units (Commission I.1). Thor was Secretary of ISO Technical Committee 12: Quantities and Units from 1982 until 2009, when he was appointed the chairman of the committee. In addition to standards, Thor is a two-time Swedish basketball champion in the 1950s.

References

1935 births
2012 deaths
Swedish physicists
Swedish engineers
Academic staff of the KTH Royal Institute of Technology